Kokkinogeia is a village in the municipality of East Mani, Laconia, Greece. It is the southernmost village in mainland Greece. It is part of the local community of Lagia. Its population was 9 at the 2011 census.

References

Populated places in Laconia
Populated places in the Mani Peninsula